Jesús Arturo Paganoni Peña (born 24 September 1988) is a Mexican professional footballer who plays as a defender.

Career

Atlas
Paganoni began his playing career in the Atlas youth teams in 2006. He managed to break into the first team on April 14, 2007, during a 2–0 loss to Guadalajara in the Clasico Tapatio.

Personal life
Paganoni is of Italian descent.

External links
 
 

1988 births
Living people
Mexican footballers
Liga MX players
Atlas F.C. footballers
Irapuato F.C. footballers
Deportivo Toluca F.C. players
C.D. Veracruz footballers
Association football midfielders
Footballers from Guadalajara, Jalisco
Mexican people of Italian descent